Chuk Yuen or Chuk Un was a village and an area in New Kowloon of Hong Kong. The area located in the approximate area of present-day Wong Tai Sin. The name now also refers to two public housing estates, Chuk Yuen North and Chuk Yuen South Estates.

There is a village in proper Chuk Yuen at the junction of Shatin Pass Road and Lung Cheung Road.

History
The original village of Chuk Yuen was centred approximately around the current Wong Tai Sin Fire Station, beside Shatin Pass Road. During early British rule of New Kowloon, Shatin Pass Road was a road from a point from Kai Tak Airport to Shatin Pass in the north ridge via villages of Po Kong and Chuk Yuen.

A forest of bamboo surrounded the village, and the village's name is derived therefrom - Chuk Yuen means bamboo garden in Chinese language. A river from the range north ran by the village west emptying into Kowloon Bay via Po Kong.

In 1921, a Taoist priest built Wong Tai Sin Temple west of the village, and a Taoist group Sik Sik Yuen was established to manage the temple at the same time.

After World War II and the years around the Chinese Civil War, a large influx of refugees rushed into Hong Kong and built their home on the hill sides. Hong Kong Government zoned the hilly area north of the temple as Chuk Yuen Resettlement Area, which covered present-day Chuk Yuen North Estate, Chuk Yuen South Estate and Upper Wong Tai Sin Estate.

In 1956, the government decided to relocate the residents of squatters and Chuk Yuen Village in the resettlement area to high-rise residential blocks. Two Wong Tai Sin Estates, "Upper" and "Lower", were built. A special block with better in-house facilities was constructed for indigenous villagers. Originally, the Wong Tai Sin temple was threatened as it was within the development project. However, the Tung Wah Group of Hospitals successfully persuaded the government to preserve the temple.

The housing project of the two Wong Tai Sin Estates were completed in early 1960s. The name of Wong Tai Sin gradually gained popularity over Chuk Yuen, though the temple continues to use the address of No. 2 Chuk Yuen Village.

Later, the northern part of the settlement area was replaced with the Chuk Yuen North and Chuk Yuen South estates. The Chuk Yuen Bus Terminus at Chuk Yuen Road, between two estates, hosts many bus routes to other areas of Hong Kong.

Nowadays, Chuk Yuen commonly refers to the estates, the bus terminus, and surroundings.

In the 2019 and 2020 policy addresses, the chief executive stated that the government intends to take back possession of the remaining Chuk Yuen United Village and to redevelop the land into high-density public housing.

Notable buildings
Chuk Yuen Children's Reception Centre, at Fung Wong San Tsuen, a temporary home for children when their parents are not suitable to take care of them.
The Salvation Army Chuk Yuen Corps was set up on 26 June1956, as a vocational centre for youngsters with a primary school for children. It was opened by the then Governor of Hong Kong Sir Alexander Grantham and about one hundred distinguished guests attended .

References

External links

History of Sik Sik Yuen
A brief section on Upper Wong Tai Sin Estate

 
New Kowloon
Wong Tai Sin District
Villages in Wong Tai Sin District, Hong Kong